Volodymyr Dmytrovych Bondarenko (4 December 1952 – 24 August 2021) was a Ukrainian politician who served as People's Deputy of Ukraine and as member of the citizens' association Choice. Bondarenko was the Head of the Kyiv City Administration from 7 March 2014 until 25 June 2014.

Biography
Bondarenko was born on 4 December 1952 in the village of Okhinky, in Chernihiv Oblast of what was then the Ukrainian Soviet Socialist Republic.

Education
 1972 - he graduated from Pryluky pedagogical college named after I. Franko, Department of Labor
 1977 - graduated from Kyiv State University named after T. Shevchenko, History Department, with qualification of history and social science teacher
 1998 - he graduated from the same university, law faculty, with qualification of lawyer

Career
 1976-1977 - history and geography teacher at Kalynivska 8-year school, Gorodyshchensky district, Cherkasy region
 1977-1986 - work at Komsomol and Communist Party: Leningradsky Rayon Komsomol Committee, Kyiv Komsomol Committee and Leningrad Rayon Communist Party Committee of Kyiv city
 1986-1990 - Deputy Chairman, the 1st vice-chairman of the Leningrad Rayon Council of People's Deputies of Kyiv city
 1990-1991 - Chairman of the Leningrad Rayon Council of People's Deputies of Kyiv city
 1991-1992 - Head of the housing department, Deputy Head of the Kyiv City State Administration
 1992-1996 - Head of Marketing Department, JSC "KyivNaftoProduct"
 March 1996-July 1996 - Deputy Minister of Justice of Ukraine, Chief of Administrative Service of the Ministry of Justice
 2014 - Head of the Kyiv City State Administration

Volodymyr Bondarenko also entered the faction of Reforms and Order party (leader - Viktor Pynzenyk). He as well actively participated in the Orange Revolution.

Business and social activities 

 JSC "Aktiv"
 JSC "Ukzovnіshpalyvo"
 research and production enterprise (rus. - NPP) "Linoplast" (recycling and waste disposal)
 LLC "Anvi"
 Public Association "We"
 Public organization Festival “Kyivska Rus"
 Charitable Foundation "Ridna Oselya"

Family and hobbies

Volodymyr Bondarenko was married and has two daughters:

 Spouse Halyna (born 1951), a historian
 Daughter Oksana, (born 1976), married as Oksana Velychko, later Rotmanskij, Coordinator of the government and civic initiative “Together against corruption”
 Daughter Olha, (born 1981), is working at the law firm Salkom
His hobbies were gardening, horticulture, beekeeping, folk art.

Criminal charges
Bondarenko was the owner of an ethnographic complex "Ukrainian Village" just outside Kyiv, a careful reconstruction of rural life in 19th-century Ukraine. However, there are criminal allegations that he built the village by appropriating State-owned land, and with no license. 
Bondarenko was investigated in 2005. 

As well,  the origin of the wealth of the daughter, Ms. Oksana Velychko, have been under severe judicial and press scrutiny, and her credibility as an anti-corruption activist put in doubt

Verkhovna Rada
 April 1996 - April 1998 - People's Deputy of the 2nd convocation of the Verkhovna Rada of Ukraine in Leningradsky electoral district No. 8 in Kyiv. Member of the Committee on the basic industries and social-economic development of the regions
 March 1998 - April 2002 - People's Deputy of the 3rd convocation of the Verkhovna Rada in electoral district No. 212 in Kyiv. Member of the Committee on Industrial Policy (since July 1998)
 April 2002 - May 2006 - People's Deputy of the 4th Verkhovna Rada in electoral district No. 219 in Kyiv, elected from the Yushchenko bloc "Our Ukraine". Member of the State Committee on national construction and local self-government issues (since June 2002), Chairman of the subcommittee on election laws and citizens associations. At the 2006 national parliamentary elections his Reforms and Order Party won in an alliance with PORA 1.47% of the popular vote and no seats. After the Kyiv local election 2006 Volodymyr Bondarenko became a deputy in the Kyiv City Council for the Vitaliy Klychko Bloc and was in rigid opposition to the team of then mayor Leonid Chernovetsky. He took an active part in political battles that were unfolding almost at every session of the Kyiv City Council. He actively supported the idea of holding a referendum for impeachment of the mayor and City Council team.
 since November 2007 - People's Deputy of the 6th Verkhovna Rada from the Yulia Tymoshenko Bloc, No. 100 in the list. Member of the Budget Committee (since December 2007), Chairman of the subcommittee on tracking the influence of legislation on the budget performance (since January 2008)
 Chairman of the Subcommittee on tracking the impact of legislation on the budget performance, Budget committee of Verkhovna Rada
 Deputy member of the permanent delegation to the Parliamentary Assembly of the Organization for Security and Cooperation in Europe
 Member of the Group for Interparliamentary Relations with the People's Republic of China
 Member of the Group for Interparliamentary Relations with the Republic of Chile
 Member of the Group for Interparliamentary Relations with Japan
 Member of the Group for Interparliamentary Relations with Canada
 Member of the Group for Interparliamentary Relations with the South African Republic
 Member of the Group for Interparliamentary Relations with the Islamic Republic of Afghanistan
 Member of the Group for Interparliamentary Relations with the Republic of Italy

In the 2012 Ukrainian parliamentary election Bondarenko was Batkivshchyna's candidate in single-member districts number 219 (first-past-the-post wins a parliament seat) located in Kyiv; with 44.2% of the votes he was re-elected into parliament. His Reforms and Order Party merged into All-Ukrainian Union "Fatherland" in June 2013.

Local Kyiv politics
In the 2014 Kyiv mayoral elections he finished 3rd (after Vitali Klitschko who won with almost 57% of the votes) with 8%. He was elected into the Kyiv City Council since his party won 3 seats.

In the 2014 parliamentary election Bondarenko was a candidate in single-member districts number 219 in Kyiv; but this time was defeated by Petro Poroshenko Bloc candidate Oleksandr Tretiakov.

In the October 2015 Kyiv local elections Bondarenko was again candidate for Mayor of Kyiv for Batkivshchyna. He lost this election (again to Klitschko), but was elected into the Kyiv City Council.

In the October 2020 Kyiv local election Bondarenko was placed third on a Kyiv City  Council district list in Kyiv's Shevchenkivskyi District by Batkivshchyna. He was not elected.

See also
 2002 Ukrainian parliamentary election
 Our Ukraine–People's Self-Defense Bloc
2007 Ukrainian parliamentary election
List of Ukrainian Parliament Members 2007

References

External links 
 Volodymyr Bondarenko's profile at Verkhovna Rada official web portal

1952 births
2021 deaths
Second convocation members of the Verkhovna Rada
Third convocation members of the Verkhovna Rada
Fourth convocation members of the Verkhovna Rada
Sixth convocation members of the Verkhovna Rada
Seventh convocation members of the Verkhovna Rada
Reforms and Order Party politicians
People from Chernihiv Oblast
Taras Shevchenko National University of Kyiv alumni
All-Ukrainian Union "Fatherland" politicians
Governors of Kyiv